Overshoot  may refer to:

 Overshoot (population), when a population exceeds the environment's carrying capacity
 Overshoot: The Ecological Basis of Revolutionary Change, 1980 book by William R. Catton, Jr.
 Overshoot (signal), when a signal exceeds its steady state value
 Overshoot (microwave communication), unintended reception of microwave signals
 Overshoot (migration), when migratory birds end up further than intended
 Overshoot (typography) the degree to which a letter dips below the baseline, or exceeds the cap height
 Overshoot (combat aviation), a key concept in basic fighter maneuvers (BFM)
Overshoot (epidemiology), when the proportion of a population infected exceeds the herd immunity threshold
 In economics, the overshooting model for the volatility of exchange rates